Marthana is a genus of harvestmen in the family Sclerosomatidae found in Southeast Asia.

Species
 Marthana affinis Banks, 1930
 Marthana aurata (Roewer, 1955)
 Marthana bakeri Roewer, 1955
 Marthana balabacana Suzuki, 1977
 Marthana beharensis (Roewer, 1955)
 Marthana birmanica (Roewer, 1955)
 Marthana cerata (Roewer, 1912)
 Marthana columnaris Thorell, 1891
 Marthana columnaris Roewer, 1955
 Marthana cornifer Loman, 1906
 Marthana cuspidata Loman, in Weber 1892
 Marthana ferruginea (Roewer, 1911)
 Marthana furcata Banks, 1930
 Marthana fusca (Roewer, 1912)
 Marthana idjena (Roewer, 1955)
 Marthana moluccana (Roewer, 1955)
 Marthana negrosensis (Roewer, 1955)
 Marthana nigerrima (Müller, 1916)
 Marthana niveata (Roewer, 1955)
 Marthana perspicillata (Roewer, 1911)
 Marthana sarasinorum Roewer, 1913
 Marthana scripta (Roewer, 1955)
 Marthana siamensis (Roewer, 1955)
 Marthana turrita Thorell, 1891
 Marthana turrita (Roewer, 1910)
 Marthana vestita With, 1905

References

Harvestmen
Harvestman genera